ERG (ETS-related gene) is an oncogene. ERG is a member of the ETS (erythroblast transformation-specific) family of transcription factors. The ERG gene encodes for a protein, also called ERG, that functions as a transcriptional regulator. Genes in the ETS family regulate embryonic development, cell proliferation, differentiation, angiogenesis, inflammation, and apoptosis.

Function 
Transcriptional regulator ERG is a nuclear protein that binds purine-rich sequences of DNA. Transcriptional regulator ERG is required for platelet adhesion to the subendothelium and regulates hematopoiesis. It has a DNA binding domain and a PNT (pointed) domain. ERG is expressed at higher levels in early myelocytes than in mature lymphocytes (types of white blood cells). Therefore, ERG may act as a regulator of differentiation of early hematopoietic cells.

The Mld2 mutation, generated through an ENU mutagenesis screen, was the first non-functional allele of Erg. Homozygous Mld2 is embryonic lethal at day 13.5. Adult mice heterozygous for the Mld2 mutation have hematopoietic stem cell defects. This means that when the ERG gene was not actively transcribed and the ERG protein produced, a mouse's hematopoietic cells were unable to function properly. Since ERG is important to the ability of the hematopoietic cells to function and self-renew, there may be applications in using blood stem cells for tissue repair, transplantation and other therapeutic applications.

Cancer 

This gene can be classified as a proto-oncogene. During chromosomal translocations that occur in cell division,  ERG can accidentally get stuck onto a different chromosome than where it belongs. This is analogous to another translocation, the Philadelphia chromosome. This results in fusion gene products, which can have bad consequences for cells. Examples of these fusion gene products would be TMPRSS2-ERG and NDRG1-ERG in prostate cancer, EWS-ERG in Ewing’s sarcoma, and FUS-ERG in acute myeloid leukemia. DNA binding protein ERG fuses with RNA binding proteins EWS and TLS/FUS in Ewing's sarcoma and acute myeloid leukemias respectively and function as transcriptional activators. ERG and its fusion proteins EWS-ERG and TLS/FUS-ERG inhibit apoptosis. Morpholino splice-switching oligonucleotides have been used to induce exon 4 skipping in prostate cancer cell lines, mouse models and tissue explants, leading to anti-cancer effects, including reduction of proliferation and induction of apoptosis.

TMPRSS2 gene fusion 
ERG can fuse with TMPRSS2 protein to form an oncogenic fusion gene that is commonly found in human prostate cancer, especially in hormone-refractory prostate cancer. This suggests that ERG overexpression may contribute to development of androgen-independence in prostate cancer through disruption of androgen receptor signaling. The fusion gene is critical to the progression of cancer because it inhibits the androgen receptor expression and it binds and inhibits androgen receptors already present in the cell. Essentially TMPRSS2-ERG fusion disrupts the ability of the cells to differentiate into proper prostate cells creating unregulated and unorganized tissue. In 90% of prostate cancers overexpressing ERG, they also possess a fusion TMPRSS2-ERG protein, suggesting that this fusion is the predominant subtype in prostate cancer.

EWS gene fusion 
Ewing's sarcoma is associated with chromosomal translocations, which typically results in fusion genes with transcriptional regulators. This means that the protein transcribes for with the gene could be produced in excess or under- produced resulting in unnatural activity in cells. Typically this is the first step in a cell's progression to malignancy. In about 10% of Ewing's Sarcoma cases have an EWS1-ERG fusion.

Fusion with TLS/FUS 
In acute myeloid leukemia, the t(16;21) translocation in myeloid leukemia fuses TLS/FUS to ERG which disrupts the natural TLS/FUS RNA binding domain, and instead inserting the ERG DNA binding domain.

Location
ERG is located on chromosome 21. The ERG protein is expressed at a similar level throughout the body.

Interactions 
ERG has been shown to interact with:
 C-jun
 ETS2
 EWSR1
 FUS
 TMPRSS2
 USP9X

References

Further reading

External links 
 

Transcription factors
Oncogenes